Olivier Frébourg (14 September 1965, Dieppe) is a French journalist, writer and publisher.

Career 
As a journalist, he wrote for Libération, Le Figaro Littéraire, Géo (as great reporter), le Figaro Magazine,  and several foreign newspapers.

A literary advisor at Éditions du Rocher from 1988 to 1990, then literary director at La Table Ronde from 1992 to 2003, he created the Éditions des Équateurs in 2003.

Always fascinated by the sea, himself an emeritus navigator, he was received among Les Écrivains de marine in October 2004, a literary group founded by Jean-François Deniau.

Works 
 1989: Roger Nimier. Trafiquant d'insolence, éditions du Rocher, series "Les Infréquentables",   - Prix des Deux-Magots
 1991: Basse saison, Albin Michel,  - Prix du premier roman de la ville de Caen
 1994: La vie sera plus belle, Albin Michel,  - Prix des lycées d’Ile de France
 1998: Port d'attache, Albin Michel,  - Prix François Mauriac de l’Académie française, Prix Queffélec
 1998: Souviens-toi de Lisbonne, La Table Ronde, 
 2000: Maupassant, le clandestin, reprint Gallimard series "Folio"  - Prix du Cercle de la Mer
 2001: La Normandie, National Geographic, reprint in 2004  - photographs by Hélène Bamberger (National Géographic)
 2002: Ports mythiques, 
 2002: Esquisses normandes, National Geographic, 
 2004: Vietnam, Chine,  - (photographs by Nicolas Cornet)
 2004: Un homme à la mer, Mercure de France, 
 2011: Gaston et Gustave, Mercure de France,  - Prix Décembre
 2014: La Grande Nageuse, Mercure de France, 

References

External links 
 Olivier Frébourg, éditeur au long cours on Libération
 Olivier Frébourg, un marin à l'ancre on L'Express
 Olivier Frébourg on France Inter

20th-century French writers
21st-century French writers
20th-century French journalists
21st-century French journalists
Writers from Normandy
Prix des Deux Magots winners
Prix Jean Freustié winners
Prix Décembre winners
1965 births
People from Dieppe, Seine-Maritime
Living people